Eric Redrobe (born 23 August 1944 in Wigan) is an English former association footballer who played in the Football League as a striker for Bolton Wanderers, Southport and Hereford United during the 1960s and 1970s.

Career
Redrobe played rugby league for Lancashire Schoolboys, and received contract offers in that sport, but chose to play association football instead. He exhibited excellent ball control.

A former England youth international, he started his career at Bolton Wanderers making four appearances and scoring one goal in two-and-a-half seasons. He had a trial at Colchester United before joining Southport in 1966. In his first season, he scored the winning goal in Southport's last away game, then, needing to win their last home game to secure promotion from the Fourth Division, he set up the only goal of the game for George Andrews. Called 'Big Eric' or 'Big Red' by Southport fans, Redrobe was a regular in the side during its three seasons in the Third Division before relegation.

After another three seasons in the Fourth Division, he was sold for a fee of £6,000 to Hereford United, newly elected to the Football League, in October 1972; he scored nine goals as the Bulls were promoted at their first attempt. He remained at Edgar Street until the end of Hereford's successful 1975–76 season when they won the Third Division. He dropped into non-league football to play for Bath City before a brief return to Hereford in 1977. He later became a bailiff.

In 2007, he was chosen as the Southport fans' all-time favourite player as part of the Professional Footballers' Association centenary celebrations.

References

External links
 Interview from the Lancashire Evening Post

1944 births
Living people
Footballers from Wigan
English footballers
Association football forwards
Bolton Wanderers F.C. players
Southport F.C. players
Hereford United F.C. players
Bath City F.C. players
English Football League players
Southern Football League players